The iPad Pro is a premium model of Apple's iPad tablet computer. It runs iPadOS, a tablet-optimized version of the iOS operating system. 

The original iPad Pro was introduced in September 2015, and ran iOS 9. It had an A9X chip, and included a 9.7-inch display. The second-generation iPad Pro, unveiled in June 2017, had an upgraded A10X Fusion chip and included a larger 10.5-inch display. The third-generation iPad Pro, announced in October 2018, eliminated the home button, and featured an 11-inch display and Face ID. The fourth-generation iPad Pro, introduced in March 2020, included the A12Z chip, and added support for the Magic Keyboard. The fifth-generation iPad Pro, announced in April 2021, incorporated a desktop-class M1 chip, making it the first iPad model to not use an A-series processor. The sixth- and current-generation iPad Pro, introduced in October 2022, includes the M2 chip, Apple Pencil Hover, and ProRes video.

History

First generation 

The first generation of iPad Pro came in two sizes: 12.9-inch and 9.7-inch.  The 12.9-inch version was announced on September 9, 2015 and released on November 11, 2015. It was larger than all previous iPad models, was the first iPad to feature LPDDR4 RAM, and originally shipped with iOS 9.1.  The 9.7-inch iPad Pro was announced on March 21, 2016 and released ten days later.  It was based on the form factor of the iPad Air 2 and originally shipped with iOS 9.3.

Second generation 

On June 5, 2017, the second generation iPad Pro was announced, which features A10X Fusion processors, with storage options of 64 GB, 256 GB, and 512 GB. Upgraded displays include a 10.5-inch version to replace the 9.7-inch model, while the 12.9-inch version was refreshed. Both sizes employed refresh rates up to 120 Hz, better HDR and TrueTone white balancing. Following this announcement, both models of the first-generation iPad Pro were discontinued. The iPad 10.5-inch and the Gen 2 iPad 12.9-inch were the last iPad Pro models with Home Button.

Third generation 

They feature full-screen displays, with the 11-inch model replacing the 10.5-inch model of the previous generation. They also feature up to 1 TB of storage and Face ID using a sensor array on the top bezel which, unlike iPhone models featuring Face ID, can unlock the iPad in any orientation. The home button was completely removed in favor of a larger display. Due to having an all-screen design, these devices are the first iPads to lack a physical button on the front. These are also the first iPad Pro models to come with USB-C connector replacing Apple's Lightning connector. It launched with a Smart Keyboard Folio (sold separately), but also supports the Magic Keyboard with a trackpad launched in early 2020.

Fourth generation 

The fourth generation of iPad Pro was announced on March 18, 2020, with the same screen sizes of the previous generation. It offers a redesigned camera module, an A12Z processor, 128 GB minimum storage, LiDAR Scanner (<5m distance), and support for the Magic Keyboard with a trackpad that is sold separately.

Fifth generation 

The fifth generation of iPad Pro was announced on April 20, 2021, with the same design and screen sizes as the previous generation. It includes the Apple M1 chip, 5G connectivity, Thunderbolt 3/USB 4 connectivity (up to 40 Gbit/s), external display output up to 6K resolution, 8 or 16 GB of RAM, and on the 12.9" variant, an XDR display with mini-LEDs marketed as "Liquid Retina XDR".

Sixth generation 
The sixth generation iPad Pro was announced on October 18, 2022 along with the iPad (10th generation). They use the same design as the previous generations (since 2018). It includes an Apple M2 chip, Apple Pencil Hover (a feature that allows the display to detect the Apple Pencil up to 12mm above) , and ProRes Video Recording (limited to 1080p for 128GB storage and up to 4K for at least 256GB storage).

Accessories 
There are three primary accessories made specifically for iPad Pro, all of which are sold separately: an active bluetooth tracking stylus, Apple Pencil; an attachable keyboard, Smart Keyboard; and a form-fitted silicone case that is compatible with the Smart Keyboard. Additionally, with the inclusion of a USB-C connector in the third-generation and newer iPad Pro, it is now possible to connect to other displays and devices, and to charge other devices with the iPad Pro.

Smart Keyboard and Smart Cover 

Smart Keyboard docks are specific with iPad Pro using the visible : magnetic with three pins that provides data transfer and power. The keyboard doubles as a kickstand, and is comparable to that of the competing Microsoft Surface Pro. The design of the Smart Keyboard is similar to the design of the Smart Cover accessory.

Apple Pencil

First generation 
The first-generation Apple Pencil is a precision stylus exclusive to the iPad Pro, iPad (2018), iPad (2019), iPad Air (2019) and iPad Mini (5th generation). The accessory is rechargeable via the Lightning port on iPad itself on the pre USB-C models. iPad Pro introduces a new display with increased responsiveness and precision over previous iPad displays with Apple Pencil support added. During the keynote, Apple demonstrated drawing, managing publication layout, and document annotation.

Second generation 

On October 30, 2018, Apple announced an updated Pencil alongside the third generation iPad Pro. The second-generation Apple Pencil functions exclusively with the 2018 and later iPad Pro models, the iPad Air 4, and the iPad mini 6. It is similar in design and specifications to the first model, but without the detachable connector, and part of the stylus is flattened to inhibit rolling. It contains tap-sensitive zones on its sides that can be mapped to functions within apps. Custom laser engraving is available when purchased via the Apple Store online.

USB-C accessories 
Apple created various adapters to pair with the 2018 iPad Pro models, which are the first iPad models to come with USB-C connector replacing the proprietary Lightning connector. These adapters utilize the new USB-C connector, which allows the iPad to connect with HDMI cables, USB ports, and read SD cards. Using an HDMI cable, users can connect their iPad to another display, such as a computer, laptop, or television. The USB and SD card support allows user to transfer and save files to and from external memory storage devices.

Third-party developers have taken advantage of the inclusion of USB-C connection in the third-generation iPad Pros to create other adapters, which can include several adapters in one connection. The USB-C port allows the iPad Pro to integrate with various USB-C accessories, ranging from USB-C docking stations, USB-C to USB-A generic adapter with a flash drive, ethernet, and so on. It can also charge other devices; for instance, you can plug in a USB-C to Lightning cable to charge your phone or AirPods; you can even charge one iPad with another one with the included USB-C to USB-C cable. There are also USB-C to USB-A adapters, and a USB-C to HDMI adapter to view the iPad display on your television or monitor; wired keyboards and mice also work. This is not restricted to supported/approved devices.

Magic Keyboard 

The Magic Keyboard features the first trackpad designed for an iPad, a hinge to adjust the viewing angle and includes a USB-C port for pass-through charging. The Magic Keyboard is supported by all iPad Pro devices introduced since 2018. Though initially expected to launch in May 2020, orders shipped starting in late April 2020.
The Magic Keyboard was met with mixed reviews. While providing many features which users wanted, there were some downsides to it. The Magic Keyboard provided a proper typing experience and supplied a good trackpad bundled with excellent build quality. On the downside, the added weight to the iPad Pro for this functionality, a missing function key row and a steep price, made the Magic Keyboard an accessory only for a niche market. With the launch of 5th generation of iPad Pro on 20 April 2021, a white color has also been added to the Apple Store.

Reception

General reviews 

Despite Apple advertising the tablets as PC replacements, most reviewers noted that it could not replace a laptop running the Microsoft Windows, macOS, or Linux desktop operating systems with its current operating system.

2015/2016 models 
Scott Stein from CNET praised the faster processor and new accessories available. However, he criticized the cost of both the unit and its accessories, while noting its slightly slower processor with less RAM compared to the larger 12.9-inch model. Matt Swider from TechRadar complimented the easy handling, large 256 GB configuration and True Tone display, but was upset about the high starting price. Gareth Beavis gave a positive review, commending the expansive screen and audio quality but stated that the battery life could be made longer.

The iPad Pro's 9.7-inch version set a record among all currently released tablets tested in color accuracy, screen reflectance, peak brightness, contrast rating in high ambient light, and smallest color variation. However, the iPad Pro 12.9-inch version tested to having better contrast ratio in the dark.

2017 models 
Max Parker from TrustedReviews and Gareth Beavis from TechRadar both praised the 10.5-inch model's high-quality audio and performance, though both critics noted that it was expensive.

Reviewing the 12.9 inch second-generation iPad Pro, Lauren Goode of The Verge complimented the quality camera, A10X processor and large screen size, but argued that the device could have been cheaper.

2018 models 
The third generation iPad Pro models were praised for their better displays, slimmed bezels, the addition of Face ID and general speed as well as CPU improvements. Ben Sin from Forbes noted that despite the LCD screen, the 120 Hz refresh rate makes it feel more smooth. The switch to USB-C connectors received mixed reviews; external monitor support and device charging were added at the cost of extra dongles to use older cables and headphones. Some reviewers noted that although the hardware updates are great steps forward, iOS's limitations, including the lack of external storage capabilities, prevents the third generation from competing against computers. Its high prices were also criticized.

iPadOS addresses the lack of external storage on supported iPads by adding support for external storage.

The body has been criticized for bending and breaking easily. Users on forum boards have reported the iPad bending after a few days of use, or after carrying it around in a backpack. YouTuber Zack Nelson then published a video on his channel JerryRigEverything showing the device cracking and snapping in half after applying just a small amount of pressure with his hands in the center of the device. Nelson concluded that the "two weakest points [were] right dead center on either side of the iPad Pro, [and] the crack happened at the very poorly placed microphone hole and the new Apple Pencil 2 charging duct". Users reported devices already bent right out of the box, mostly cellular models. Apple responded to these reports quickly, asserting that this is normal and a non-issue, a response that has been criticized. According to Apple, the bending is a byproduct of its new manufacturing process. Apple has added a support page relating to these issues.

2020 models 
The 2020 model of the iPad Pro was seen as a minor enhancement amongst technical reviewers. The LIDAR sensor which Apple added for increased AR capability was touted as a feature only a handful of customers will use. The new camera setup in the 2020 model was noted for providing good image quality. The addition in RAM and change in storage options were welcomed, but the 2020 model was sometimes seen as "overkill".

2021 models 
The 2021 models had a vast range of reviews feeling that the already powerful processor was made excessively powerful, stating that the processor wasn't being taken advantage of due to iPadOS still being considered too limiting and not having professional apps from macOS. Camera placement has been criticized for video conferencing. The Verge has criticized that they should have had multiuser support like the Mac but they gave positive reviews to the Mini-LED and cameras.

Despite having 8 and 16 gigabytes of RAM, iPadOS only initially allowed 5 gigabytes for apps, but this was changed in iPadOS 15.

Model comparison 
 Operating system support 

 Models

Timeline

See also 
 Pen computing
 Graphics tablet

Notes

References

External links 
  – official site

Pro
IOS
Tablet computers
Touchscreen portable media players
Tablet computers introduced in 2015
Foxconn